Hendvar is a village in Chaybasar-e Jonubi Rural District, in the Central District of Maku County, West Azerbaijan Province, Iran. At the 2006 census, its population was 667, in 164 families.

References 

Populated places in Maku County